Peter Lebrecht Schmidt (28 July 1933, in Dessau, Germany – 22 October 2019, in Germany) was a German classical scholar. He was an authority on Cicero.

Publications
 Handbuch der lateinischen Literatur der Antike by Reinhart Herzog and Peter Lebrecht Schmidt
  Die Uberlieferung von Ciceros Schrift 'De Legibus' in Mittelalter und Renaissance (Munich, 1974). Peter Lebrecht Schmidt''

References

German classical scholars
1933 births
2019 deaths